Ornithocarpa is a genus of flowering plants belonging to the family Brassicaceae.

Its native range is Northern and Western Mexico.

Species:

Ornithocarpa fimbriata 
Ornithocarpa torulosa

References

Brassicaceae
Brassicaceae genera